Eratoena is a genus of small sea snails, marine gastropod molluscs in the family Eratoidae.

Species
Species within the genus Eratoena include :
Eratoena capensis (Schilder, 1933)
Eratoena corrugata (Hinds, 1844)
Eratoena gourgueti Fehse, 2010
 Eratoena gemma (Bavay, 1917)
Eratoena grata (T. Cossignani & V. Cossignani, 1997)
 Eratoena moolenbeeki Fehse, 2018
Eratoena nana (Sowerby, 1859)
 Eratoena rosadoi Fehse, 2013
 Eratoena sandwichensis (G. B. Sowerby II, 1859)
Eratoena schmeltziana (Crosse, 1867)
Eratoena septentrionalis (Cate, 1977)
Eratoena smithi (Schilder, 1933)
Eratoena sulcifera (Gray in Sowerby, 1832)
Species brought into synonymy
Eratoena pagoboi (T. Cossignani & V. Cossignani, 1997): synonym of Sulcerato pagoboi (T. Cossignani & V. Cossignani, 1997)
 Eratoena palawanica Fehse, 2011: synonym of Alaerato palawanica (Fehse, 2011) (original combination)

References

External links
 https://www.biodiversitylibrary.org/page/38709705

Eratoidae
Gastropod genera